Jeffrey Kenneth Wright (born 23 June 1952) is an English former football midfielder who spent the majority of his career at Wigan Athletic, joining from Netherfield for a transfer fee of £2,000.

References

External links

1952 births
Living people
People from Alston, Cumbria
Footballers from Cumbria
English footballers
Association football midfielders
Tow Law Town F.C. players
Kendal Town F.C. players
Wigan Athletic F.C. players
Barrow A.F.C. players
Prudhoe Town F.C. players
Gretna F.C. players
Consett A.F.C. players
Penrith F.C. players
English Football League players